The following is a list of indoor arenas in Turkey with a capacity of at least 4,000 spectators. Most of the arenas in this list have multiple uses such as individual sports, team sports as well as cultural events and political events.

Currently in use

See also 
List of football stadiums in Turkey
List of indoor arenas by capacity

References 

 
Turkey
Indoor arenas
Indoor arenas